Stridsbåt 90 H(alv) (Strb 90 H; CB90) is a class of fast military assault craft used by several countries after being originally developed for the Swedish Navy by Dockstavarvet. Its name means Combat Boat 90 Half; the 90 refers to the year of acceptance (1990) and Half refers to the fact that it can carry and deploy a half platoon of amphibious infantry (18 men) fully equipped. The CB90 is an exceptionally fast and agile boat that can execute extremely sharp turns at high speed, decelerate from top speed to a full stop in 2.5 boat lengths, and adjust both its pitch and roll angle while under way. The water jets are partially ducted, which, along with underwater control surfaces similar to a submarine's diving planes, gives the CB90 its manoeuvrability.

In addition to the many variants in service with the Swedish Navy under the "Stridsbåt 90H" designation, the CB 90 has been adopted by the navies of Norway (as the S90N), Greece, Mexico (as the CB 90 HMN), the United States (as the Riverine Command Boat), and Malaysia.

Development and adoption history 

In 1988, Dockstavarvet won a competition to design and manufacture a replacement for the aging Tpbs 200 class.  Two prototypes, with pennant number 801 and 802, were delivered in 1989. After completion of field trials, the Swedish Navy signed a purchase order for 120 boats in June 1990.

In 2002, the Swedish Navy ordered an additional 27 boats of a slightly different type, designated Stridsbåt 90 HS - where S refers to Skydd (protected) as the Strb 90 HS is armoured and  features CBRN protection (the whole boat can be over-pressurized) - intended for use in international peace-keeping operations. Apart from the addition of armour, it sports air-conditioning for deployment in tropical conditions, fuel cooling system, 230 V generator and more powerful engines. The manufacturer sometimes refers to the model as the CB 90 HI, where the I probably stands for International.

Several of the tasks carried out by the Strb 90 H-variants, were originally intended for the Strb 90 E, which is now almost completely phased out.

The Royal Norwegian Navy evaluated the Strb 90 H in early 1996, and subsequently purchased a total of 20 boats, designated 90 N (for Norsk utgave, literally Norwegian version).

The Mexican Navy acquired 40 units (designated CB 90 HMN) between 1999 and 2001, and obtained a production license in 2002, allowing further units to be manufactured in Mexico. Since then eight additional units have been built.

The German Water Police rented a Combat Boat 90H from the manufacturer Dockstavarvet for the 33rd G8 summit in Heiligendamm, Germany. This boat was involved in a high-speed chase with three Greenpeace RIBs which were trying to enter the restricted area near the hotel where the meeting was being held. A video clip of the incident was later widely spread around the internet.

In July 2007 The United States Navy Expeditionary Combat Command (NECC) specified the CB90 for testing as its Riverine Command Boat. SAFE Boats International of Bremerton, Washington, was given a US$2.8 million contract to produce one prototype. The CB90 was subsequently adopted, and two were involved in an incident with Iran in 2016.

In June 2009 an unknown buyer from Abu Dhabi bought two civilian luxury versions.

In 2010, Dockstavarvet Shipyard modified two CB90's to be carried in the davits of Dutch and UK Navy Landing Platform Docks. During these six months trials, the two boats and a full Swedish boat squadron were embarked on a Royal Netherlands Navy LPD as a fully integrated element of the amphibious forces aboard and successfully deployed.

In 2013 JSC Pella Shipyard near St Petersburg launched the first Russian built Raptor-class patrol boat "Raptor", but while the ships are strikingly similar there is no indication Dockstavarvet has been involved or licensed the design to Pella.

Versions 

Several Strb 90 H have been converted by the Swedish Navy to fill various roles:

 The Strb 90 L is outfitted for battalion-level command and control, with computer and communications equipment and an auxiliary generator to provide electrical power when the engines are not running.  The L stands for ledning (command or leadership).
 The Strb 90 KompL is a plain Strb 90 H in which portable computer and communications equipment has been installed, allowing it to temporarily provide company-level command and control.  Electrical power is provided by a rather loud portable generator installed on deck.
 The Strb 90 HS is designed for overseas peace-keeping and rescue operations.  It is modified to keep its crew comfortable in Mediterranean conditions, with air conditioning, an auxiliary generator, a head, and more comfortable crew stations.  More importantly, it is armored, and its engines have been upgraded to compensate for the added weight.
 At least one Strb 90 H, pennant number 802, is equipped with a decompression chamber.
 The Swedish Police operate one unarmed Strb 90 H equipped with bunks, a pantry and a crew lounge.
 The Swedish Sea Rescue Society operates two unarmed Strb 90 Hs converted for search and rescue.
 Hellenic Coast Guard operate also since 1998 three CB90 under the CB90HCG which is a slightly different version of the Norwegian Navy Version

Norwegian version
The Royal Norwegian Navy operates 20 CB90s under the designation SB90N; the N simply stands for Norsk utgave (Norwegian version).  The S90N differs from the Strb 90 H in a few areas:

 It is armed with two M2 Browning heavy machine guns (port and starboard), and a Sea PROTECTOR Remote controlled weapon station.
 The anchor winch is motorized, and the anchor is mounted at the stern, allowing a grounded S90N to tow itself afloat rather than risk damage to its impellers.
 It carries an auxiliary generator which provides electrical power to navigation and communications systems even when the engines are not running.
 The troop compartment has a higher deck height, making it possible for most people to stand without crouching.
 It has two water tight compartments in the bow, having an extra room for toilet and stores.
 It has a much more sophisticated navigation equipment based on GPS-technology delivered by Kongsberg Seatex AS.

At least one S90N has been reconfigured into a floating ambulance.

In 2004, the Royal Norwegian Navy conducted tests (including a live fire exercise) to evaluate the effectiveness of the SB90N as an aiming and launching platform for the Hellfire missile.  One SB90N was equipped with stabilized Hellfire-launcher based on the Protector (RWS), and its machine gun was replaced with a gimbal-mounted sensor package containing visible-light and infrared cameras and a laser designator.  Although the tests were successful, there is currently no indication that the Royal Norwegian Navy will actually deploy SB90Ns armed with Hellfire missiles in regular service. The Hellfire can still be carried on the boats without launching platforms and be fired from shore with the Portable Ground Launch System.

The CB90s are used by the Coastal Ranger Commando.

Incidents and accidents involving CB90s 
There were eight soldiers on board; seven of them sustained more or less severe injuries, including fractures, while one soldier who was standing in the machine gun ring-mount on mid-deck remained physically unhurt.

On June 13, 2004, several Strb 90 H from the Swedish First Marine Regiment (AMF1) were sailing at high speed in convoy formation when one of them abruptly reduced speed (allegedly so its wake would not upset a smaller sailboat).  The boat immediately behind it failed to react and rammed it.  Two soldiers who were above deck at the time of the accident were hit and thrown in the water; both were killed almost instantly.

On the night of October 23, 2006, a CB90 sank off of Hamnudden, east of Utö in the Stockholm archipelago. The boat was traveling at  due to the bad weather when it suddenly began to take on water from the bow. It then sank in less than ten minutes. All of the crew of 16 were quickly picked up by other ships that were nearby. No one was physically injured, but the crew suffered from shock and hypothermia when picked up.

On October 5, 2014, a Royal Malaysian Navy CB90 bearing registration number CB204 was reported lost at sea due to storm and high tides. There were seven crewmen on board. The boat was last detected at 1.05pm some 57 nautical miles off Labuan Island. The boat was found on October 6 near Station Lima, after its distress call was heard by KD Paus, a Jerung-class gunboat, with no injuries to all 7 crew. It was reportedly caused by engine and steering problems.

On January 12, 2016, two U.S. Navy riverine command boats were "taken into custody" by Iran's Revolutionary Guards' Navy near Farsi island in Persian Gulf. An Iranian state-run news outlet reported that 10 U.S. sailors had been "arrested" even though Iranian and U.S. officials said that none of the sailors were harmed and that they would be released promptly. Officials have stated that one of the boats broke down very close to Iranian territorial waters and after drifting for a short time both were picked up by Iranian forces. According to Stars and Stripes newspaper, the crews were released a short time later.

Operators 

 
Hellenic Coast Guard: 3 
Hellenic Army
 Malaysian Navy: 5 unit CB90, 12 unit CB90HEX
 Mexican Navy: 48
 Royal Norwegian Navy: 20
 Royal Swedish Navy: 147 in service, 18 on order
 Royal Navy: 4, formerly leased from the Royal Swedish Navy, used to evaluate the option of potential acquisition and returned to the Swedish Navy.
 US Navy: 6, known as 'Riverine Command Boat'
 Marina de Guerra del Perú: SIMA Peru will build, on behalf of the Peruvian Navy, in agreement with the N.Sundin Dockstavarvet factory, a subsidiary of the Swedish group SAAB, the first 2 ultra-fast combat boats out of a total of 24 that will be used for maritime interdiction work on the Peruvian coast.

Related development 
Storebro SB90E
Combat Boat 2010

See also
G class landing craft
Uisko class landing craft
Jurmo class landing craft
Jehu-class landing craft
KMC Komando
Multi-purpose Attack Craft
Project 03160 "Raptor" High-Speed Patrol Boat
Cotecmar LPR-40
Centaur-class fast assault craft
Mark V Special Operations Craft

References 

 Stridsbåt 90H at SoldF.com, an unofficial site dedicated to information about Swedish military materiel.
 Et fremtidsrettet prosjekt, an article about the Hellfire experiment on the official web site of the Norwegian military.
 A series of pictures of a Norwegian S90N

External links 
 
Video of CB90 in action on the Amazon River (Windows Media Player) Note: Commercial video, but shows the boat's capabilities.
(YouTube) CB 90 Hellfire Trials.
SoldF about Strb 90H, in Swedish

Ships of the Swedish Navy
Ships of Sweden
Patrol vessels of the Royal Norwegian Navy
Patrol vessels of the Hellenic Coast Guard
Riverine warfare
Military boats
Landing craft